is a 1964 Japanese erotic film directed by Sadao Nakajima in his directorial debut. It is based on Futaro Yamada's novel of the same title.

Plot
In the Siege of Osaka, five female ninjas who pregnanted with Toyotomi Hideyori's child escape from Osaka Castle by the order of Sanada Yukimura. Tokugawa Ieyasu orders Hattori Hanzō to assassinate them all. On the other hand, Senhime raises her hand against Ieyasu and tries to protect them.

Cast
 Omayu - Mari Yoshimura
 Senhime - Yumiko Nogawa
 Oyui - Sanae Nakahara
 Oyu - Yuriko Mishima
 Hannyadera Fuhaku - Yoshio Yoshida
 Amamaki - Shingo Yamashiro
 Usuzumi - Shoichi Ozawa
 Stebei - Kyosuke Machida
 Hayato -  Minoru Ōki
 Tokugawa Ieyasu - Miechō Soganoya
 Sanada Yukimura - Eizō KItamura
 Lady Kasuga - Michiyo Kogure
 Hattori Hanzō - Ryūji Shinagawa
 Sakazaki Dewanokami - Shigeru Tsuyuguchi

See also
Kunoichi Keshō 2nd in Futaro Yamada's Kunoichi film series.
Ninpō-chushingura 3nd in Futaro Yamada's Kunoichi film series. Directed by Yasuto Hasegawa

References

External links

1964 films
Films directed by Sadao Nakajima
1960s Japanese-language films
Ninja films
Samurai films
Cultural depictions of Sanada clan
Cultural depictions of Tokugawa Ieyasu
Cultural depictions of Hattori Hanzō
1960s Japanese films